Kotlin is a Russian island, located near the head of the Gulf of Finland,  west of Saint Petersburg in the Baltic Sea. Kotlin separates the Neva Bay from the rest of the gulf. The fortified city of Kronstadt is located on the island and forms part of a World Heritage Site that is Saint Petersburg and Related Groups of Monuments. The island serves as a gateway to Saint Petersburg and as such has been the site of several military engagements. The Kotlin programming language is named for the island, much as the Java programming language shares its name with an Indonesian island.

History
The city of Kronstadt was founded on Kotlin island by Peter the Great, who took it from the Swedes in 1703. In March 1921, Kotlin was the site of the Kronstadt rebellion, which resulted in over 11,000 casualties.

Geography

The island thus divides the seaward approach to St Petersburg into two channels; that on the northern side is obstructed by shoals which extend across it from Kotlin to Lisiy Nos; the southern channel, the highway to the former capital, is narrowed by a spit which projects from opposite Lomonosov on the Russian mainland, and, lying close to Kronstadt, has been historically strongly guarded by batteries.

Started in 1980, but delayed by political upheaval in the 1990s, the dam project was completed in 2010 and officially commissioned in 2011.

Transportation
The low water depth in Neva Bay was an incentive to build a Sea Canal to accommodate large vessels, this canal allows the  movement of vessels with a draft of 11 metres (to fresh water), a length of 320 metres and a width of 42 metres.

References

External links
Google Earth view of Kotlin Island

Islands of Saint Petersburg
Russian islands in the Baltic
Gulf of Finland
Saint Petersburg Ring Road